Prema Sangama is a 1992 Indian Kannada-language romance film directed by Bhargava and written by Karaikudi Narayanan. The film stars Ambareesh and Malashri. The film had cinematography by R. Madhusudhan and the dialogues and lyrics are written by Chi. Udaya Shankar.

The film's music was composed by Rajan–Nagendra and the audio was launched on the Lahari Music banner.

Cast 

 Ambareesh
 Malashri 
 Tara
 Hema Choudhary
 Jai Jagadish
 Saikumar
 Shivaram
 Mynavathi
 Ramesh Bhat
 M. S. Umesh
 Honnavalli Krishna
 Kunigal Nagabhushan
 Sohini
 Anitharani

Soundtrack 
The music of the film was composed by Rajan–Nagendra with lyrics by Chi. Udaya Shankar, Su. Rudramurthy Shastry, Shyamsundar Kulkarni and Sri Ranga.

References

External links 
 

1992 films
1990s Kannada-language films
Indian romance films
Films scored by Rajan–Nagendra
1990s romance films